Jonathan Ssebanja (born 10 September 1988) is a Ugandan cricketer. He played in the 2014 ICC World Cricket League Division Three tournament. In July 2019, he was one of twenty-five players named in the Ugandan training squad, ahead of the Cricket World Cup Challenge League fixtures in Hong Kong.

In April 2021, he was named in Uganda's Twenty20 International (T20I) squad for their series against Namibia. He made his T20I debut on 5 April 2021, for Uganda against Namibia. Uganda and Namibia played the second and third matches of their T20I series on the same day, with Sebanja playing in both of them.

References

External links
 

1988 births
Living people
Ugandan cricketers
Uganda Twenty20 International cricketers
Place of birth missing (living people)